Bhagyadevatha is a 2009 Indian Malayalam-language comedy-drama film written and directed by Sathyan Anthikkad from a story by Rajesh Jayaraman. It features Jayaram, Kaniha, and Narain.

Plot 
Benny Chacko, a cable operator, is ambitious about earning wealth and getting rich. His friend gives him the idea of getting married so he can use the dowry to fulfill his dreams. Benny marries Daisy. To his dismay, he realizes that his father-in-law has not been able to arrange for the dowry, as agreed. This angers Benny but he decides to be patient and wait a few months before taking any further step. Meanwhile, he informs Daisy that until the dowry is received, their relationship would remain unconsummated. Three months pass but Daisy's father is unable to give Benny the entire dowry. Benny is angered, and he drops Daisy at her home. He tells her parents that she can return home after the dowry has been arranged for. Daisy and her family are greatly saddened by his behavior but they are unable to say or do anything. Benny's family is equally disappointed but they are helpless as well.

One day, Benny learns that Daisy has won a lottery for two crore rupees. He tries to woo Daisy back since she is now a rich woman. However, she spurns all his attempts. Benny develops a suspicion that she is thinking of remarriage. Meanwhile, Benny's sister begins a relationship with a colleague Roshan. The two families learn about the relationship. After initial resistance, Roshan's mother agrees to the couple getting married. However, she asks for a dowry of ten lakh rupees. Benny tries hard to arrange for the sum but he is unsuccessful. On the day of the marriage, he flees home, unable to face anyone. Finally, Benny's friend Kunjabdulla finds him. They return home to find everyone readying for the wedding. The dowry has been arranged for and given to Roshan's family. Benny learns that Daisy has given the dowry for the marriage. He realizes how generous Daisy was, in spite of the shabby way he treated her and her family. He is deeply repentant and asks Daisy for forgiveness. They reunite.

Cast 

 Jayaram as Benny Chacko
 Kaniha as Daisy Benny
 Narain as Sajan Joseph
 Samvrutha Sunil as Selin Sajan
 Innocent as Mathew Palakkal  
 Nedumudi Venu as Sadanadan Pillai
 Reshmi Boban as Pareethu's daughter
 K. P. A. C. Lalitha as Annamma
 Mamukkoya as Pareethu
 Venu Nagavalli as Anto
 Vettukili Prakash as Charlie
 Lakshmi Priya as Sofia
 Santhakumari as Nabeezumma
 P. Sreekumar as Puthumana Achan
 Nikhila Vimal as Sali, Benny's sister 
 Lakshmi Sanal 
 Manjusha Sajish
 Vanitha Krishnachandran as Rosy
 Rugmini as Theyyamma  Benny's grandmother
 Sethulakshmi

Soundtrack
Bhagyadevatha's songs and background score are composed by Ilaiyaraaja. The lyrics were written by Vayalar Sarathchandra Varma. The music album has 3 songs:

Reception 
Sify gave film a three star-rating and the verdict good. The music score by Illayaraja was appreciated by Indiaglitz.com.

Box office
The movie was commercially successful.

References

External links
 

2009 films
2000s Malayalam-language films
Indian comedy-drama films
Films shot in Alappuzha
Films with screenplays by Sathyan Anthikad
Films directed by Sathyan Anthikad
Films scored by Ilaiyaraaja